The Thames by-election of 1893 was a by-election held during the 11th New Zealand Parliament in the electorate of .

Background
The by-election was caused after the resignation of Liberal Party MP Alfred Cadman. The Liberals selected the incumbent Mayor of Thames, James McGowan as their candidate for Cadman's seat. After a large public gathering, it was decided not to run another candidate against McGowan in light of a general election being only months away, resulting in McGowan being elected unopposed.

References

Thames 1893
1893 elections in New Zealand